Robert Hosack Karch (July 4, 1894November 14, 1958) was an American football player. 

Karch was born in 1894 in Columbus, Ohio.

He played college football at Ohio State and was selected by Frank G. Menke to the 1916 All-America college football team.

He also played professional football as a tackle in the National Football League (NFL). He played for the Columbus Panhandles (1922) and the Louisville Brecks (1923).  He appeared in six NFL games, all as a starter.

Karch sustained a heart attack in 1955 and shot and killed himself at his home in Bexley, Ohio, in 1958.

References

1894 births
1958 suicides
Players of American football from Columbus, Ohio
American football offensive tackles
Ohio State Buckeyes football players
Columbus Panhandles players
Louisville Brecks players
Suicides by firearm in Ohio